Claes Göran Carlsson (born 12 December 1963) is a Swedish curler.

Teams

Men's

Mixed

Mixed doubles

References

External links
 
 

Living people
1963 births
Swedish male curlers
Swedish curling champions